Laura Troschel (3 November 1944 – 29 September 2016) was an Italian actress, singer and model.

Life and career
Born in Varese, Troschel made her debut in cinema in a role of weight in The Sex of Angels (1968), by Ugo Liberatore.  Later, she appeared in some movies as Constanza Spada, until she became the wife of comedian Pippo Franco and resumed her original name. Between the 1970s and 1980s she participated with her husband in a number of comedy films. She was also active in television, as a presenter of some popular shows with Pippo Franco and as an actress in several miniseries.

Selected filmography
 The Sex of Angels (1968)
 Four Flies on Grey Velvet (1971)
 Terrible Day of the Big Gundown (1971)
 Furto di sera bel colpo si spera (1973)
 Nerone (1977)
 L'imbranato (1979)
 Ciao marziano (1980)
 Il ficcanaso (1981)
 The Trap (1985)
 Raul: Straight to Kill (2005)

Discography

 Albums  
 1979 - C'era una volta Roma (Cinevox, CAB 2005, LP) (con Pippo Franco)
 1988 - Laura Troschel (Yep, YLP 11, LP)

 Singles 
 1977 - Quanto sei bella Roma (con Pippo Franco)/L'autostop (Cinevox, SC 1099)
 1979 - Tu per me sei come Roma (con Pippo Franco)/La fornarina (Cinevox, SC 1135)
 1980 - Scacco matto (con Pippo Franco)/La sua mano (CBS, 9094)
 1985 - Per una donna/Vite di plastica (Video/Radio, VR 0024, 7")
 1986 - Ma la domenica/A pensarci bene non mi piace il Brasile (RCA Italiana, BB-7573)

References

External links 
 

1944 births
2016 deaths
Italian film actresses
Italian television personalities
Actors from Varese
Italian television actresses
Italian women singers
20th-century Italian actresses